James Bennet may refer to:

 James Bennet (journalist) (born 1966), American journalist
 James Bennet (politician) (1830–1908), Liberal Party Member of Parliament in New Zealand
 James Bennet (clergyman) (1817–1901), Presbyterian clergyman and author
 James Arlington Bennet (1788–1863), American attorney, newspaper publisher, educator, author

See also 
 James Bennett (disambiguation)